Titãs is the debut album of Brazilian rock band Titãs. It is the only album to feature André Jung on drums. The album also features Pena Schmidt's production and some contributions from vocalist Ciro Pessoa, who founded the band only to quit before the album was released. Though the album sold poorly (less than 50,000 copies by the time of its release), it generated some hit singles and secured some performances at popular TV shows such as the ones presented by Chacrinha and Hebe Camargo. By August 1997, its total sales were at 109,000.

In its cover, there is a picture of the members in which they appear to be slightly pending to their right, but in reality they were all standing straight. The photograph was taken in a ramp-like surface and later adjusted in the cover so that all members were aligned.

Song information 
Ron Dunbar's classic AOR hit "Patches" was reworked and renamed "Marvin", with a live version featuring on Titãs' 1997 live album Acústico MTV and becoming a hit single. Jimmy Cliff's "The Harder They Come" was also reworked and named "Querem Meu Sangue". It was also performed live, with Cliff himself as a guest, in Acústico MTV.

A song called "Charles Chacal" (written by Britto and named after Venezuelan terrorist Carlos the Jackal) was composed during the recording sections, but never made it to the album due to then-rampant government censorship by the Brazilian military government. It was only recorded once, when the band performed it live at a TV Cultura show called "Fábrica do Som". In 2013, the song was covered by Brazilian band Garotas Suecas, with the guest performance of Paulo Miklos, who commented:

Track listing

Personnel 
 Nando Reis - lead vocals, Bass guitar in "Sonífera Ilha", "Go Back", "Mulher Robot" and "Pule"
 Paulo Miklos - Lead vocals, bass guitar, keyboards in "Go back"
 André Jung - drums and percussion
 Arnaldo Antunes - Lead vocals
 Branco Mello - Lead vocals
 Tony Bellotto - Electric guitar, backing vocals
 Sérgio Britto - Lead vocals and keyboards
 Marcelo Fromer - Electric guitar

Additional personnel
 Alberto Marcicano - Zither in "Demais"
 Eduardo Souto Neto - Arrangement and conducting of metals in "Querem Meu Sangue" and "Balada Para John e Yoko")
 George Freire Soprano Saxophone in "Marvin"
 Gil and Nono -Trumpet
 Proveta and Baldo - Saxophone
 Ivan - Trombone

References 

1984 debut albums
Titãs albums
Warner Music Group albums
Portuguese-language albums